Josip Gucmirtl (16 March 1942 – 24 November 2009) was a Croatian football player. Gucmirtl first started playing for his hometown club NK Osijek before coming to Croatian powerhouse Dinamo Zagreb in 1965. Gucmirtl played as a striker for Dinamo throughout the remainder of his career, appearing in a total of 409 matches and scoring 109 goals for the Blues (including 191 appearances and 54 goals in the Yugoslav First League). He is mainly remembered for being a member of Dinamo's Golden Generation which won the 1966–67 Inter-Cities Fairs Cup, the club's only European silverware in history.

Club career
He debuted for Dinamo on 7 February 1965 in an Eternal Derby game against Hajduk Split at Maksimir, and his last match for Dinamo was on 25 June 1973 against Red Star Belgrade. Apart from the Inter-Cities Fairs Cup, Gucmirtl also won the 1969 Yugoslav Cup with Dinamo.

References

External links

1942 births
2009 deaths
Footballers from Osijek
Association football forwards
Yugoslav footballers
NK Osijek players
GNK Dinamo Zagreb players
Yugoslav First League players
Burials at Mirogoj Cemetery